('Palmgren Coeducational School'), originally  ('Practical Work School for Children and Youth'), in Stockholm, Sweden, was the first school in Scandinavia to offer coeducation up to the studentexamen. It was also the first to offer sloyd, a handicraft-based education, in addition to theoretical subjects.

A later co-owner and rector was Carl Nordblad; the other co-owner was well-known mathematics teacher and textbook author . Henning L. Håkanson (1892–1985) was rector from 1925 to 1963.

Gradually, it developed into a complete school of 12 classes in two sections, an early primary school and a later primary school. In 1915 the school was taken over by a joint-stock company and in 1925 by the religious Fredrika Foundation.

Between 1877 and 1938 the school had several different addresses on Malmtorgsgatan and Arsenalsgatan before settling at Kommendörsgatan 13.

Primary school was introduced gradually from 1962  The school was private but was municipalized in 1974. Operations ended on 10 June 1977 after the 100th school year. The French government bought the building in 1988 for 8.4 million SEK and has converted the exterior of the Q-marked (culturally protected) building into an embassy building.

In the autobiographical book Laterna magica, Ingmar Bergman has commented on the teachers at the Palmgren Coeducational School. The film Torment is also autobiographical and deals with the school. Notable teachers include Oskar Lindberg (1910–1920) and Eric Ericson (1944–1952).

Notable students (selection) 

 Lena Adelsohn Liljeroth (born 1955), minister of culture
 Fanny Alving (1874–1955), author
 Ingmar Bergman (1918–2007), director
 Ingrid Bergman (1915–1982), actress
 Åke Bonnier (born 1957), bishop
 Sonja Branting-Westerståhl (1890–1981), lawyer
 Karin Ekelund (1913–1976), actress
 Charles de Champs (1873–1959), Navy officer
 Yngve Larsson (1881–1977), municipal commissioner
 Ester Blenda Nordström (1891–1948), journalist and author
 Valfrid Palmgren Munch-Petersen (1877–1967), linguist and educator

References

Further reading

External links 

Educational institutions established in 1876
Educational institutions disestablished in 1977
Schools in Stockholm
Defunct schools in Sweden
Sloyd